Tirana 3 is one of the 24 administrative units in Tirana.

References

Tirana 03